The State of Hanover was a short-lived state within the British Zone of Allied-occupied Germany. It existed for 92 days in the course of the dissolution of the Free State of Prussia after World War II until the foundation of Lower Saxony in 1946. The state saw itself in the tradition of the former Kingdom of Hanover, annexed by Prussia in 1866, reflected in the Saxon Steed state emblem. After Lower Saxony was founded by merging Hanover with several smaller states, it continued to use the Hanover emblems.

Geography 
The State of Hanover covered the territory of the former Prussian Province of Hanover without those eastern parts that had become part of the Soviet occupation zone after World War II (Amt Neuhaus and the eastern part of Bleckede, Elbingerode and Ilfeld). It, therefore, included 85 percent of the present-day state of Lower Saxony.

History 
After the Second World War, the State of Hanover was founded under Ordinance No. 46 of the British military government dated 23 August 1946 "concerning the dissolution of the provinces of the former State of Prussia in the British zone and their recreation as independent states". Its first minister-president was the Social Democratic politician Hinrich Wilhelm Kopf.

Nevertheless, on 23 November 1946 the British Military Government had approved the formation of the new state of Lower Saxony from the unification of the German states of Brunswick, Oldenburg and Schaumburg-Lippe with Hanover at the instigation of their German leaders. Kopf also discussed other territorial options for a Lower Saxony state which would have also included Bremen and the region of Ostwestfalen-Lippe.

Like the eastern parts of Hanover, the eastern areas of Brunswick which had fallen to the Soviet zone, including the former County of Blankenburg and the exclave of Calvörde (part of the Helmstedt district) were excluded and later integrated into the East German state of Saxony-Anhalt. Only the Hanoverian Amt Neuhaus and those parts of Bleckede, which had also lain on Soviet-occupied territory, were again united with Lower Saxony after the German reunification in 1990.

See also 
 Hanover (city)
 Hanover Region

External links 
Wochenschau Film zur Wiederherstellung des Landes Hannover 1946 

Former states and territories of Lower Saxony

Allied occupation of Germany
1946 establishments in Germany
1946 disestablishments in Germany
Former republics